Captain Houghton Townley was a writer. He authored The Gay Lord Waring, The Bishop's Emeralds and The Splendid Coward which were adapted to film. F. McGrew Willis wrote the film adaptation of his novel The Gay Lord Waring.

The Bishop's Emeralds was a drama featuring English society life.

Townley served in the British Army.

Bibliography
Secret of the Raft
A Minion
His Own Accuser
The Bishop's Emeralds (1908), W. J. Watt & Co., illustrated by Will Grefe
The Scarlet Feather (1909)
English Woodlands and Their Story (1910)
The Gay Lord Waring (1910)

Filmography
The Gay Lord Waring (1916)
The Splendid Coward (1918)
The Bishop's Emeralds (1919)

Further reading
Dictionary of British Comic Artists by Alan Clark, Writers and Editors, The British Library, 1998, pp. 165–166

References

British writers
Year of birth missing (living people)